

See also
List of settlements in Kent by population
List of civil parishes in Kent
:Category:Civil parishes in Kent
:Category:Towns in Kent
:Category:Villages in Kent
:Category:Geography of Kent
List of places in England

Places
Kent